Wakakirri is an Australian national Story-Dance festival for primary and Secondary schools that has been running since 1992. Wakakirri is a word from the Aboriginal Wangaaypuwan people meaning "to dance". The name was chosen at the inception of the event in 1992 to give it a uniquely Australian context and feeling.

Wakakirri Association and Research

Primary School Challenge

Secondary School Challenge

National Screen Challenge

Past Categories
 Story Singing
 Story Telling 
 Story Writing
 Story Arts
 Story Boarding

Signature Item
 2006 - Key 
 2007 - Ring 
 2008 - Tap
 2009 - Spring
 2010 - Duck
 2011 - Bug
 2012 - Twelve
 2013 - Cake
 2014 - Sun
 2015 - Chicken
 2016 - Star
 2017 - Gift
 2018 - Fly
 2019 - Sloth
 2020 - Dragon
 2021 - Monkey
 2022 - Rise

Past Primary Challenge Winners
 1999 - 'Unknown' Hackham East Primary School
 2000 - 'Charlotte's Web' Moreton Downs State Primary School 
2006 - 'When The Going Gets Tough' Edwardstown Primary School
 2007 - 'Our Only Home' Altona North Primary School 
 2008 - 'Four Walls, Free Spirit' Holy Spirit Primary School
 2009 - Queanbeyan West Public School
 2010 - Beechboro Primary School
 2011 - 'True Inspiration' Dapto Public School  
 2012 - 'The Last Dance' Pearcedale Primary School
 2013 - 'Such is Life - Ned Kelly' Torrens Primary School 
 2014 - 'The Window Within' Aberfoyle Hub School 
 2015 - 'Fantastic Mr Fox' Rosary Primary School
 2016 - 'Be Inspired' Dapto Public School
 2017 - 'Turning Heads, Making Waves' Chapel Hill State School
 2018 - 'We’ve Got The Power' Mango Hill State School
 2019 - 'Jack And The Giants' Berwick Primary School
 2020 - 'Through The Smoke' Whitefriars Primary School

Past Secondary Challenge Winners
 2006 - 'Drawing The Line' St Patrick's College, Launceston 
 2007 - 'A Fence, Our Journey, An Identity' Engadine High School
 2008 - 'An Eternity Imprisoned' Engadine High School
 2013 - 'Turning Tides' Our Lady Of The Sacred Heart College
 2014 - 'Idol 2.0' East Hills Boys High School
 2015 - 'One Of Us' Rosebud Secondary College
 2016 - 'The Leap' Northmead Creative & Performing Arts HS
 2017 - 'The Greatest Gift You Can Give' Mount Annan Christian College
 2018 - 'The Rabbits' Tuggerah Lakes Secondary College
 2019 - 'Be Carful What You Whisper’ Hoppers Crossing Secondary College
 2020 - 'A Life Lived In Fear Is A Life Half-Lived' Daramalan College

External links 
Wakakirri Story Festival

Dance in Australia
Performing arts education in Australia
School dance competitions
Recurring events established in 1992
Arts festivals in Australia
Festivals established in 1992
1992 establishments in Australia